Richard Woodville, 1st Earl Rivers  (1405 – 12 August 1469), also Wydeville, was the father of Elizabeth Woodville and father-in-law of Edward IV.

Early life
Born at Maidstone in Kent, Richard Woodville was the son of Richard Wydeville (Woodville), chamberlain to the Duke of Bedford, and Joan Bittlesgate (or Bedlisgate), the daughter of Thomas Bittlesgate of Knightstone in the parish of Ottery St Mary in Devon. He was also a grandson of John Wydeville who was Sheriff of Northamptonshire (in 1380, 1385, 1390).

Marriage and courtly career

Woodville followed his father into service with the Duke of Bedford. In 1433 the Duke had married the 17-year-old Jacquetta of Luxembourg; she was the Duke's second wife and he was significantly older and in ill health. When the Duke died in 1435, Jacquetta was left a childless and wealthy widow. She was required to seek permission from King Henry VI before she could remarry, but in March 1437 it was revealed that she had secretly married Richard Woodville who was far below her in rank and not considered a suitable husband for the lady still honoured as the king's aunt. The couple were fined £1000, but this was remitted in October of the same year.

Despite this inauspicious start, the married couple soon prospered, thanks mainly to Jacquetta's continuing prominence within the royal family. She retained her rank and dower as Duchess of Bedford, which initially provided an income of between £7000 and £8000 per year, though over the years this diminished as a result of territorial losses in France and collapsing royal finances in England. Richard Woodville was honoured with military ranks, in which he proved himself a capable soldier.

Further honours for both came when Henry VI married Margaret of Anjou, whose uncle was Jacquetta's brother-in-law (Jacquetta's sister Isabelle married Margaret of Anjou's paternal uncle Charles du Maine). The Woodvilles were among those chosen to escort the bride to England, and the family benefited further through this double connection to the royal family. Sir Richard was raised to the rank of Baron Rivers in 1448. Therefore their children would grow up enjoying considerable privilege and material comfort.

Military career
Woodville was a captain in 1429, served in France in 1433 and was a knight of the regent Duke of Bedford in 1435. He was at Gerberoy in 1435 and served under William de la Pole, Duke of Suffolk, in 1435–36. He then fought under Somerset and Shrewsbury in 1439 and the Duke of York in 1441–42, when he was made captain of Alençon and knight banneret. 

Woodville was created Baron Rivers by Henry VI on 9 May 1448. Two years later, as Sir Richard, he was invested as a Knight of the Garter in 1450.  He was appointed seneschal of Gascony in 1450 (but failed to reach it before its fall) then lieutenant of Calais in 1454–55.  He was appointed Warden of the Cinque Ports in 1459 to defend Kent against invasion by the Yorkist earls (but was captured at Sandwich).

In the Wars of the Roses, he was initially a Lancastrian, but he became a Yorkist when he thought that the Lancastrian cause was lost. He reconciled himself to the victorious Edward IV, his future son-in-law. On 1 May 1464, Edward married Rivers' daughter Elizabeth, widow of Sir John Grey of Groby. Richard was created Earl Rivers in 1466, appointed Lord Treasurer in March 1466 and Constable of England on 24 August 1467.

Later career
The power of this new family was very distasteful to the old baronial party, and especially so to the Earl of Warwick. Rivers was regarded as a social upstart, and in an ironical episode, his future son-in-law in 1460, while accepting his submission, had rebuked him for daring, given his lowly birth, to fight against the House of York. The Privy Council, in its horrified response to the King's marriage, said bluntly that Richard Woodville's low social standing in itself meant that the King must surely know "that Elizabeth was not the wife for him". Early in 1468, the Rivers estates were plundered by Warwick's partisans, and the open war of the following year was aimed at destroying the Woodvilles. After the Yorkist defeat at the Battle of Edgecote on 26 July 1469, Rivers and his second son John were taken prisoners at Chepstow. Following a hasty show trial, they were beheaded at Kenilworth on 12 August 1469.

Richard Woodville's eldest son Anthony succeeded him in the earldom.

Lord Rivers had a large family. His third son, Lionel (d. 1484) became the Bishop of Salisbury. All his daughters made great marriages: Catherine Woodville, his eighth daughter, was the wife of Henry Stafford, 2nd Duke of Buckingham.

"Woodville" is the modern spelling of the name: in their own time "Wydeville", "Wydville" and other variants were used.

Issue
Richard and Jacquetta had 15 children:
 Elizabeth Woodville (c. 1437 – 1492), married first Sir John Grey of Groby, and second Edward IV of England
 Lewis Woodville (c. 1438–1450), died in childhood
 Anne Woodville (1439–1489), married first William Bourchier, Viscount Bourchier, and second George Grey, 2nd Earl of Kent
 Anthony Woodville, 2nd Earl Rivers (1442–1483), married Elizabeth Scales, 8th Baroness Scales
 Mary Woodville (1443–1481), married William Herbert, 2nd Earl of Pembroke
 John Woodville (1445–1469), married Catherine Neville, Dowager Duchess of Norfolk
 Lionel Woodville (1447–1484), Bishop of Salisbury
 Martha Woodville (d. c. 1500), married Sir John Bromley of Baddington
 Joan Woodville (1452–1512), married Sir Anthony Grey, son of Edmund Grey, 1st Earl of Kent
 Richard Woodville, 3rd Earl Rivers (1453–1491)
 Margaret Woodville (1454–1490), married Thomas FitzAlan, 10th Earl of Arundel
 Edward Woodville, Lord Scales (d. 1488), soldier and courtier
 Catherine Woodville (c. 1458 – 1497), married first Henry Stafford, 2nd Duke of Buckingham, second Jasper Tudor, Duke of Bedford, she married third Sir Richard Wingfield
 John Woodville (died in Childhood)

Robert Glover, Somerset Herald, noted another 'Richard' who would seem to have been born before Richard the 3rd Earl. A 'Richard Woodville, esquire for the body' was present at the christening of Prince Arthur (son of Elizabeth and Henry VII) on 24 September 1486 in Winchester Cathedral; Arthur's grandmother, Elizabeth Woodville, served as his Godmother, and her younger brother Edward was also present at the ceremony.

The Visitation of Buckinghamshire of 1566 mentions the marriage of William Dormer of Wycombe (only later of Ascott House) to "Agnes, da. of Sir Richard Woodvyle, Erle Ryvers" but does not say whether the father was the first or the third earl, who the mother was or whether Agnes was legitimate. Considering though that she is thought to be born about 1458 the more likely candidate is the senior Richard Woodville.

In fiction
Woodville is a primary character in Philippa Gregory's 2011 novel about Jacquetta of Luxembourg, The Lady of the Rivers. In The White Queen television series, he is portrayed by Robert Pugh.

Notes

References
 
 
 
 
 

|-

People of the Wars of the Roses
Knights of the Garter
Lord High Treasurers of England
Woodville family
Lords Warden of the Cinque Ports
Earls Rivers
1405 births
1469 deaths
People executed under the Yorkists
Executed people from Kent
People executed under the Plantagenets by decapitation
People from Maidstone
Knights banneret of England